Berean Christian School may refer to:
 Berean Christian School (Fairview Heights, Illinois)
 Berean Christian School (Knoxville, Tennessee)
 Berean Christian School (West Palm Beach, Florida)
 Berean Christian High School (Walnut Creek, California)
 Berean Academy (Florida) — Lutz, Florida
 Berean Academy (Kansas)